Lambari may refer to:

Places 
 Lambari, Minas Gerais, a municipality in Brazil
 Lambari River (Pará River tributary), a river in southeastern Brazil
 Lambari River (Verde River tributary), a river in southeastern Brazil

Species common names 
 Lambari, a common name for tradescantia zebrina
 Lambari, Portuguese common name for the species Astyanax

Other uses 
 A clan of the Bharwad, people of India

See also 
 Lambari d'Oeste